Cornulites is a genus of cornulitid tubeworms. Their shells have vesicular wall structure, and are both externally and internally annulated. They usually occur as encrusters on various shelly fossils. Their fossils are known from the Middle Ordovician to the Carboniferous.

References

Tentaculita
Protostome enigmatic taxa
Paleozoic life of Ontario
Paleozoic life of Alberta
Paleozoic life of New Brunswick
Paleozoic life of Nova Scotia
Paleozoic life of Quebec